The 1932 Victorian Football Association season was the 54th season of the Australian rules football competition. The premiership was won by the Northcote Football Club, after it defeated Coburg by 26 points in the final on 24 September. It was the club's second VFA premiership, and the first in a sequence of three premierships won consecutively from 1932 until 1934.

Premiership 
The home-and-home season was played over twenty matches, before the top four clubs contested a finals series under the amended Argus system to determine the premiers for the season.

Ladder

Finals

Awards 
 Frank Seymour (Northcote) was the leading goalkicker for the season, kicking 109 goals in the home-and-home season and 122 goals overall. Seymour's total set a new record for the most goals in a season, breaking his own record of 110 goals set in 1930.
 Bob Ross (Northcote) won the Recorder Cup as the Association's best and fairest, polling nine votes. Jim Jenkins (Coburg), H. Jones (Camberwell) and N. Driver (Oakleigh) tied for second with eight votes apiece.
 Brunswick won the seconds premiership. Brunswick 13.15 (93) defeated Coburg 4.13 (37) in the Grand Final at the Coburg Cricket Ground on 1 October.

Notable events 
 After winning back-to-back premierships in 1930 and 1931, many of Oakleigh's players either retired or transferred to the League, weakening Oakleigh's playing list so significantly that it won only three matches and received the 1932 wooden spoon.
 A new semi-perpetual trophy was presented to the Association by Grant Hay, to be presented each year to the premiers then won permanently by the first club to win it three times. Northcote, by winning the 1932, 1933 and 1934 premierships, became permanent holders of the trophy without any other club ever being presented it.

See also 
 List of VFA premiers

References 

Victorian Football League seasons
VFL